Union Makes the Nation (abbreviated UN or the Union) is an alliance of opposition political parties in Benin. It is composed of the MADEP, PSD, RB, Key Force, MDS, UNDP, MARCHE, PDPS and RDL VIVOTEN, and therefore represents an expansion of the Alliance for a Democratic Dynamic to embrace most of the significant Beninese parties opposed to the government of President Yayi Boni. The Union contested the 2011 presidential and parliamentary elections. Their presidential candidate, Adrien Houngbédji, was credited with 35.7% of the vote; he issued a statement rejecting the validity of the election results. In the parliamentary elections, the Union took 30 seats out of 83 to become by far the largest opposition party.

References

Political party alliances in Benin